Paddy (Pigeon number NPS.43.9451) was an Irish carrier pigeon awarded the Dickin Medal after being the fastest pigeon to arrive back in England with news of the success of the D-Day invasion, out of hundreds dispatched. He flew 230 miles (370 km) across the English Channel in four hours and fifty minutes, the fastest recorded crossing, and was awarded the medal on 1 September 1944, just under three months after the crossing. Paddy was trained by Andrew Hughes of Carnlough and is the only animal in Ireland to be awarded this medal.
The medal citation reads,
 
His medal was sold at auction for almost £7,000 in September 1999.

See also
 List of individual birds

References

Individual domesticated pigeons
1954 animal deaths
Recipients of the Dickin Medal